Adam Faucett is an American singer-songwriter born in Benton, Arkansas, and based out of Little Rock.

History
Faucett was originally a member of Russellville, Arkansas-based band Taught the Rabbits, and has been performing solo since 2006.  After Taught the Rabbits broke up, Faucett relocated to Chicago where he focused on folk music, writing his first album 'The Great Basking Shark, which was then recorded in Little Rock.  He toured behind that effort, raising enough money to record a second album in 2008, 'Show Me Magic, Show Me Out,' followed by 'More Like a Temple' in 2011.  During this time he toured the United States and Europe with acts such as Lucero, Calexico, The Legendary Shack Shakers, Vetiver, Chuck Ragan (of Hot Water Music) and Damien Jurado.

Faucett's music is heavily influenced by his home state of Arkansas and the American South. His music has been described as "southern soul swamp opera," but elements of experimental rock, psychedelic rock, and noise rock are reoccurring elements.

Discography

References

External links 
 Official website

American male singer-songwriters
Year of birth missing (living people)
Living people
People from Benton, Arkansas
Singer-songwriters from Arkansas